Berit Granquist (21 May 1909 – 12 December 2001) was a Swedish fencer. She competed in the women's individual foil event during the 1936 Summer Olympics.

References

External links
 

1909 births
2001 deaths
Swedish female foil fencers
Olympic fencers of Sweden
Fencers at the 1936 Summer Olympics
People from Boden Municipality
Sportspeople from Norrbotten County
20th-century Swedish women